Around Midnight is an LP album by Julie London, released by Liberty Records under catalog number LRP-3164 as a monophonic recording in 1960, and later in stereo under catalog number LST-7164 the same year. It was released a number of times on CD from 1998.

Dick Reynolds did the arrangements and conducted the orchestra.

Track listing

 "'Round Midnight" – (Thelonious Monk, Cootie Williams, Bernie Hanighen) – 2:54
 "Lonely Night in Paris" – (Bobby Troup, Bob Alcivar) – 2:12
 "Misty" – (Erroll Garner, Johnny Burke) – 3:11
 "Black Coffee" – (Sonny Burke, Paul Francis Webster) – 2:58
 "Lush Life" – (Billy Strayhorn) – 1:41
 "In the Wee Small Hours of the Morning" – (David Mann, Bob Hilliard) – 2:49
 "Don't Smoke in Bed" – (Willard Robison) – 2:25
 "You and the Night and the Music" – (Arthur Schwartz, Howard Dietz) – 2:40
 "Something Cool" – (Billy Barnes) – 4:38
 "How About Me?" – (Irving Berlin) – 4:07
 "But Not for Me" – (George Gershwin, Ira Gershwin) – 2:24
 "The Party's Over" – (Jule Styne, Betty Comden, Adolf Green) – 3:17

References

Liberty Records albums
1960 albums
Julie London albums